The May Bumps 2005 were a series of rowing races held at Cambridge University from Wednesday 15 June 2005 to Saturday 18 June 2005. The event was run as a bumps race and was the 114th set of races in the series of May Bumps which have been held annually in mid-June since 1887. In 2005 a total of 171 crews took part (94 men's crews and 77 women's crews), with around 1500 participants in total.

Head of the River crews 
 Caius men rowed-over in 1st position retaining the headship, their 7th time since 1998.

 Jesus women bumped Pembroke, Caius and Emmanuel to take their first headship since 1994.

Highest 2nd VIIIs 
 The highest men's 2nd VIII at the end of the week was 1st & 3rd Trinity II, who bumped Caius II on the 2nd day. 1st & 3rd II achieved overlap on the 1st day but failed to make contact.

 The highest women's 2nd VIII for the 3rd consecutive year was Emmanuel II.

Links to races in other years

Bumps Charts 
Below are the bumps charts for the 1st and 2nd divisions, with the men's event on the left and women's event on the right. The bumps chart represents the progress of every crew over all four days of the racing. To follow the progress of any particular crew, simply find the crew's name on the left side of the chart and follow the line to the end-of-the-week finishing position on the right of the chart.

Note that this chart may not be displayed correctly if you are using a large font size on your browser.

May Bumps results
May Bumps
May Bumps
May Bumps